Kvasice is a municipality and village in Kroměříž District in the Zlín Region of the Czech Republic. It has about 2,200 inhabitants.

History
The first written mention of Kvasice is from 1141.

Notable people
Friedrich von Thun (born 1942), Austrian actor

References

Villages in Kroměříž District